Gainsford is a rural locality in the Central Highlands Region, Queensland, Australia.

Geography
The Dawson River forms the western boundary, while the Don River forms part of the southern on its way to join the Dawson.

Road infrastructure
The Capricorn Highway runs along the northern boundary.

References 

Central Highlands Region
Localities in Queensland